The Warsaw Radio Mast (Polish: Maszt radiowy w Konstantynowie) was a radio mast located near Gąbin, Poland, and the world's tallest structure at 2120 ft (646.38 m) from 1974 until its collapse on 8 August 1991. The mast was conceived for height and ability to broadcast the "propaganda of the Communist successes" across the world and even to remote areas such as Antarctica. It was the third tallest structure ever built, being surpassed as the tallest by the Burj Khalifa tower in the United Arab Emirates in 2009 and Merdeka 118 tower in Malaysia in 2022.

Designed by Jan Polak, its construction started on October 18th, 1972 with a ceremony and on May 18th, 1974 it was completed. Its transmitter, whose installation started in October 1973 entered regular service on 22 July of that year. The opening of the mast was met with extensive celebration and news coverage by the Polish Film Chronicle. The tower was used by Warsaw Radio-Television (Centrum Radiowo-Telewizyjne) for longwave radio broadcasting on a frequency of AM-LW (long wave) 227 kHz before 1 February 1988 and 225 kHz afterwards. Because a voltage of 120 kV existed between the mast and ground, it stood on a -high insulator. It operated as a mast radiator (half-wave radiator), so its height was chosen in order to function as a half-wavelength antenna at its broadcasting frequency. The signals from its 2 MW transmitters could be received across essentially the entire globe. The Warsaw Radio Mast's weight was debated; Polish sources claimed .

The mast was designed for national pride, mainly because of the height of the mast, which made it the tallest structure in the world, surpassing the KVLY-TV mast in Blanchard, North Dakota. It was also designed to broadcast the "propaganda of the successes." However, an unintended effect of the mast's height was that the "officially non-existent Poles of the east" could tune in to Polish radio broadcasts, including those in remote places such as Antarctica. The transmitter was so powerful that the waves of Polish Radio Programme 1 could be received in parts of Canada and the United States.

Construction
The Mast's location, which was finalized to be in Gąbin, was chosen because of the high soil conductivity and the need for a position in the centre of Poland. A large amount of research was utilized to decide where to build the mast, which included factors such as soil resistance, ownership of property, and the quality of infrastructure (especially roads). Construction began in 1969.

The mast was initially constructed to replace the Raszyn radio transmitter, which had been constructed in 1949. The Raszyn mast had been prioritized to cover the Eastern Borderlands, and so Polish authorities did not consider reception in the Recovered Territories. When it became evident that Raszyn could not provide coverage to the entire country, the station received an increase of power to 500 kW, but this too failed. In the late 1960s it was decided to construct a new central transmitter at the geographical centre of Poland. Gąbin was chosen not only due to its central position, but also its high soil conductivity. During storms, when the mast could not operate, the signal would be temporarily switched to Raszyn, a process that was eased thanks to direct phone lines from RCN Konstantynów to both Raszyn and the energy sector.

The vertical steel tubes forming the structures of the mast had a diameter of 245 millimetres (10 in); the thickness of the walls of these tubes varied between 8–34 mm (0.31–1.33 in) depending on height. To prevent the guy wires from interfering with the radio transmissions, the guys were insulated at regular intervals. An elevator and separate protected ladders were installed in the interior of the mast to facilitate access to the various mast components, including the aircraft warning lamps. The elevator was designed by Alimak, a Swedish company, and took 45 minutes to reach the top. The lift was nicknamed "Alimak", as a nod to the company that designed it. Safety was a priority, so "Alimak" had a safety procedure, where it could be stopped, but this precaution never had to be used. A maximum of 3 people could ride up the elevator, although sources claim it would be crowded. The elevator was powered by an internal combustion engine. An area for maintenance supplies was present, in order to transport materials such as lightbulbs for the aircraft warning lights. Inspection crews travelled up it once per month to replace light bulbs, and watch for cracks in the steel. If a crack was found, the transmitters were turned off and the Raszyn radio mast took over the broadcast. Any cracks were then fixed by welders from Mostostal Zabrze by making patches out of sheet metal.

In the lower half of the mast, there was a vertical steel tube, attached to the mast's outer structure with large insulators. This tube was grounded at the bottom, and connected electrically to the mast structure by an adjustable metal bar at a height of  when the tower transmitted on 227 kHz longwave and at a height of  when it switched to 225 kHz on 1 February 1988. This technique allowed adjusting the impedance of the mast for the transmitter and worked by applying a direct current ground at a point of low radio frequency voltage, to conduct static charge to ground without diminishing the radio energy. Static electrical charge can build up to high values, even at times of no thunderstorm activity, when such tall structures are insulated from ground. Use of this technique provides better lightning protection than using just a spark gap at the mast base, as it is standard at most mast radiators insulated against ground.

The mast was equipped in 16 levels with arrays of six air traffic warning lights with 200 W power. At the top there was a flashing beacon consisting of two lamps of 1,000 W.

Featuring an asymmetrical coaxial power supply, it consisted of the inner "hot" core of 24 copper wires connected to a small ring at each post, and each was connected by three insulated cables to the outer ring. The outer ring served as the support of another set of 24 wires, known as the "outer braid." The transmission line was monitored whenever the mast was in operation; at night the line was illuminated with street lights, to avoid trespassers from electrocuting themselves. The transmitter consisted of two 1,000 kW units built by Brown, Boveri & Cie. An atomic clock was used to generate the transmission frequency in order to provide a very accurate, stable signal source which could be used as a frequency standard by anyone within signal range. The transmitters had the ability for each component to be turned on manually or all be started with one button. The transmitters also had functionality of receiving remote input, but the devices needed to utilize this were not implemented in Konstanynów. When high voltage power was switched on, the transmitter was protected by two locked doors and crews were informed by way of illuminating a red lightbulb. This lightbulb was controlled by a photodiode that would additionally flash the lightbulb if a short-circuit in the transmitter was detected. The station, which had an area of 65 hectares (161 acres), also had a  lattice tower of rectangular cross-section close to the transmitter building. This tower was used to provide a radio link for programme feeds from the studio, which ran from the Palace of Culture and Science, Warsaw via a radio relay tower at Wiejca. At Konstantynów, the signal was focused on a parabolic dish at 30 dB and was captured in a horn antenna at the focal point of the dish. Upon reaching the transmitters, a dehydrator ensured that no condensation occurred. The transmission building used a NEC radio set and the TN60 multiple telephony system. This allowed for 60 telephone lines to be run off the station but the full possibilities of this system were not used.

To supply power to the station, a 110 kV substation was built. The substation was over-engineered due to the strategic importance of the station as Poland's central transmitter. Although the power consumption of the transmitting station was large (estimated 6,000 kW), the substation was capable of supplying much more than was required. Six small towers were erected around the periphery of the station's grounds in order to support aircraft warning lamps where the guy ropes were located.

The official name of the facility was Radiofoniczny Ośrodek Nadawczy w Konstantynowie (Radiophonic Transmission Centre Konstantynow), Radiowe Centrum Nadawcze w Konstantynowie (Radio Transmission Centre Konstantynow) or Warszawska Radiostacja Centralna (WRC) w Gąbinie (Warsaw Central Radio Station Gabin). It broadcast Polskie Radio's Program I (unofficially referred to as "Jedynka").

Approximately ten years after completion of the mast, inspections revealed structural damage caused by wind-induced oscillations at the mast, the backstay insulators and the guys. Repair work was considered to be expensive and difficult, so replacement of the mast by a stronger construction of the same height was considered. This was not realized as a result of Poland's worsening economic situation. In 1988, the mast was repainted, but this could not be done to the desired extent, as there was not enough paint available. A lack of equipment and training in maintenance teams led to a severe degradation of the mast's condition by the late 1980s. An inspection in May 1989 found that 13 strands of the upper guys had been fractured and, by the collapse of the mast, 7 guy wire insulators had been damaged. Another cause of the structure's deterioration was the insufficient knowledge of the strains exerted on structures of such a great height. Additionally, the managing director of Mostostal Zabrze, Adam Brzeziński, revealed to Dziennik Zachodni on March 23, 1992, that the original construction crew was not informed on the exact specifications on the conditions the mast would have to face.

Specifications

General Characteristics 

 Weight: Polish sources claim 420 tonnes (930,000 lb)
 Height:646.38 metres (2,120.67 ft)
 Coordinates: 52 22 3.74 N 19 48 8.73 E
 Frequency: 227 kHz (before February 1988), 225 kHz (after February 1988)
 Type: Guyed steel lattice mast
 Designer: Jan Polak

 Transmitter 

 Model and Manufacturer: Brown, Boveri & Cie, Brown Boveri SL 61 B3
 Power: 1,000 kW (1 MW)
 Total Power: 2,000 kW (2 MW)

 Transmitter Building 

 Volume: 17,000 m3
 Distance from mast: 
 Method of signal transportation: Overhead Radio Frequency Transmission Line

 Elevator 

 Model and Manufacturer: Alimak
 Maximum Capacity: 3 people
 Type: Climbing elevatorPower supply:' Internal combustion engine

 Staff 
The manager of the radio station from 1974 to 1980 was Zygmunt Duczmalewski. His successor, Witold Czowgan (1947-2017), served as the manager from 1983 to 1986.

The mast had a total of 30 engineers and technicians. It also had 15 administrative staff. Because a large portion of the staff was recruited from around Poland, a new block of flats was built 30 km away in Sochaczew to accommodate the staff. More specialized staff were accommodated in the guest rooms of the transmission building. The facility also had a complement of guards, hired directly by the Ministry of Interior, mainly from the local population of Konstantynów.

Collapse

At 16:00 UTC on 8 August 1991 a catastrophic failure led to the collapse of the mast. During one of the renovations involving the replacing of frayed guy wires, it was necessary to replace one of the main cables with two temporary ones. When workmen were swapping them, the gusting wind caught the temporarily unmoored tower, twisting it and pulling loose the other guys. The mast first bent and then snapped at roughly half its height. The helix building and the transmitter building (including the transmitter devices in it) were not damaged. The transmission line was also unaffected, but it was dismantled shortly after the collapse of the tower, leaving only the sustaining poles in  place. In addition, a mobile crane belonging to Mostostal Zabrze was also destroyed when the tower collapsed. Due to the absence of a construction log kept by the foreman, it was hard to determine the exact events that led to the catastrophe. The construction coordinator and the division chief of the company responsible for maintaining the mast were found liable for the collapse, and both were sentenced to 2.5 years in prison. The construction manager's sentence was eventually shortened to six months.

Replacement
After the collapse, the Polish broadcasting company used the old Raszyn transmitter with its  mast near Warsaw, which had been used since 1978 for daytime transmissions of a second Polish broadcasting service programme in the longwave range on the frequency AM-LW 198 kHz, for transmissions on AM-LW 225 kHz with a power of 500 kW. It is not possible to transmit from Raszyn on AM-LW (long wave) 198 kHz/1515 metres and 225 kHz/1333 metres simultaneously, so the transmissions on the second longwave frequency AM-LW (long wave) 198 kHz had to be discontinued until either a second longwave broadcasting transmitting facility was built in Poland or a special frequency switch, which would allow transmissions on both frequencies, was installed at the Raszyn transmitter. The latter, simpler solution would have decreased the effectiveness and reliability of both transmitters and was therefore rejected.

Because of the importance of Polish longwave transmitters to Polish people abroad, as early as April 1992 the Polish government planned to rebuild the mast at Konstantynów. In September 1995 the Polish government was set to rebuild the mast. Although refurbishment of the old foundations, which could be reused, had already started, the rebuilding of the mast was cancelled due to protests by local residents, who claimed that radiation from the mast was a health hazard. While the accuracy of these claims has not been verified, a new site for the transmitter was sought. Several other locations were considered, but due to the continuing resistance of nearby inhabitants (backed by the Solidarity trade union), planned mast height and transmitter range were both greatly reduced, and an old military site just southeast of Solec Kujawski was chosen. There were once again protests in this location, but tensions were eased when Polish Radio donated PLN 3.5 million towards the development of the local community. There, a new longwave transmission facility was built in 1998–1999, with a transmitter of 1200 kW output power for the frequency AM-LW (long wave) 225 kHz. This facility, which was inaugurated on 4 September 1999, uses one 330 metre (1083 ft) and one 289 metre (948 ft) grounded top-fed masts as aerials.

After the inauguration of the transmitter at Solec Kujawski, the transmitter at Raszyn was again used for transmitting on the frequency AM-LW (long wave) 198 kHz for the programme Radio Parliament.

At Gabin, there is currently a radio link mast, not used since 1998. In front of the entrance to the mast, a cross was erected by local residents associated with the now defunct Association for the Protection of Human Life at the Highest Mast of Europe.From 2001 to 2012, the facility was managed by the Real Estate department of TP SA. Due to the 2012 merger of TP and Orange Polska, the facility is now managed by the Orange Polska SA Real Estate Sales Office. The facility is protected against unauthorized access, as it is worth approximately PLN 3,650,000 (approx. $1 million USD).

Current state (1991–present)
Except for the mast and the radio frequency transmission line that led to it, nearly all components of the facility remain in place, unused and slowly deteriorating. Some locals have visited the remains of the mast on anniversaries, such as the 20th anniversary in 2011.

In 2018, the Swiss Brown, Boveri & Cie 2 piece radio transmitter (Brown Boveri SL 61 B3) was donated by Orange Polska, a Polish telecommunications provider, to the Babice Transatlantic Radio Station Culture Park Association. It was then transferred to Warsaw for renovation. There are plans to restore the transmitter for active usage in a museum.Now Gąbin | Equipment from the Radio Center in Konstantynów will get a new life. Will any exhibit go to Gąbin? - Now Gąbin,  

At the end of September 2021, the relay tower was decommissioned and demolished.

 In popular culture 
The Warsaw radio mast was added to The Guinness Book of World Records; the record was given for the mast's height, which was later surpassed by the Burj Khalifa.

The Warsaw Radio mast's successor and predecessor, the Raszyn Mast, was featured in multiple stamps issued by the Polish government.

The Polish Film Chronicle'', a Polish newsreel, typically presented in a cinema before a movie, featured the Warsaw Radio Mast.

See also
 Radio masts and towers
 List of catastrophic collapses of broadcast masts and towers
 KVLY-TV mast
 List of tallest structures

References

External links
 
 Diagrams of the Warsaw mast, Directional Radio Tower Konstantynow and Marking Towers of RCN Konstantynow
 Pictures showing current state of former site

Towers completed in 1974
Buildings and structures demolished in 1991
Demolished buildings and structures in Poland
Radio masts and towers in Poland
Ruins in Poland
Płock County
Polskie Radio
Buildings and structures in Masovian Voivodeship
Former radio masts and towers
1974 establishments in Poland
1991 disestablishments in Poland